was a Japanese film actress who was particularly prominent in the silent era. Her real name was Komako Kuragata.

Career
Born in Kanagawa Prefecture, Hara made her motion picture debut in 1924 in the film Rakujitsu no yume. At studios such as Tōa Kinema and Makino Talkie, she achieved fame specializing in starring roles playing vamps, dokufu (poison women), and yakuza molls in jidaigeki. In the sound era, she shifted to secondary roles in films by directors such as Kenji Mizoguchi, Masahiro Makino, and Keigo Kimura. She appeared in over 200 films in her career.

Selected filmography
 Rakujitsu no yume (落日の夢) (1924)
 Aishō (愛傷) (1926)
 The Mountain Pass of Love and Hate (愛憎峠 Aizo toge) (1934)
 Maria no Oyuki (マリアのお雪) (1935)
 Onna Sazen (女左膳) (1937)
 Chikemuri Takadanobaba (血煙高田の馬場) (1937)
 The Life of Oharu (西鶴一代女  Saikaku Ichidai Onna) (1952)

References

External links

1910 births
1968 deaths
Japanese silent film actresses
20th-century Japanese actresses
People from Kanagawa Prefecture
Japanese film actresses